Ordobrevia fletcheri, is a species of riffle beetle found in Sri Lanka.

Adult beetles are found under face of stones in the stream and stones in the shore.

References 

Elmidae
Insects of Sri Lanka
Insects described in 1923